List of permanent representatives and observers of Canada to the Organization of American States. The Permanent Representatives and Observers of Canada to the OAS have held the rank and status of Ambassador. Canada was a permanent observer at the OAS until 1990, when it became a permanent member.

Notes

See also 
 List of Ambassadors and High Commissioners of Canada

Organization of American States

Canada